Leptoscapha is a genus of sea snails, marine gastropod mollusks in the family Volutidae.

Species
Species within the genus Leptoscapha include:

 Leptoscapha crassilabrum (Tate, 1889)

References

Volutidae
Monotypic gastropod genera